New Caledonia is an unincorporated community in Union County, Arkansas, United States.

Notes

Unincorporated communities in Union County, Arkansas
Unincorporated communities in Arkansas